Acianthera tricarinata is a species of orchid.

References 

tricarinata